People v. Unger, Supreme Court of Illinois, 362 N.E. 2d 319 (1977), is a criminal case that distinguished between necessity and duress. Prisoner Unger escaped under a claim of threat of physical violence, was recaptured, and was not allowed to use a defense of necessity or defense of duress.

References

Illinois state case law
U.S. state criminal case law
1977 in United States case law